Daybreak is a 1954 West German drama film directed by Viktor Tourjansky and starring Hans Stüwe, Elisabeth Müller and Alexander Kerst.

The film's sets were designed by the art director Arne Flekstad. Filming took place at the Bavaria Studios. It was also shot on location in Munich and Hamburg.

Synopsis
After eight years as a prisoner of war of the Soviets, a German pilot returns home and becomes involved in the scheme to revive German civil aviation with Lufthansa. His new life is threatened, however, when he is put on trial for the execution of a captured British RAF pilot during the war.

Cast
 Hans Stüwe as Oberst Gaffron
 Elisabeth Müller as Inge Jensen
 Alexander Kerst as Jochen Freyberg
 Josef Sieber as Wilheilm Schramm
 Carsta Löck as Amalie Schramm
 Oliver Grimm as Pucky Schramm
 Walter Holten as Von Wakenitz
 Edward P. Merlotte as Colonel Thompson
 Renate Mannhardt as Anita Kyffland
 Gert Fröbe in a bit part
 Paula Braend
 Viktor Afritsch
 Malte Jaeger
 Kurt Großkurth
 Wolfried Lier
 Rudolf Reiff
 John Van Dreelen

References

Bibliography

External links 
 

1954 films
1954 drama films
German drama films
West German films
1950s German-language films
Films directed by Victor Tourjansky
German aviation films
World War II war crimes trials films
Films shot at Bavaria Studios
1950s German films